Borovkovo is a rural locality (a village) in Dobryansky District, Perm Krai, Russia. The population was 35 as of 2010. There are 5 streets.

Geography 
Borovkovo is located 51 km south of Dobryanka (the district's administrative centre) by road. Gari is the nearest rural locality.

References 

Rural localities in Dobryansky District